Arnfield is the English toponymic surname. Notable people with the surname include:

 Jack Arnfield, British boxer
 Ernest Arnfield, English football manager
 Marjorie Arnfield, English artist

Other 
 Arnfield Reservoir

See also 
 

English toponymic surnames